Androscoggin Wayside Park is located on the Androscoggin River in Errol, New Hampshire, along Route 16. Located in the Thirteen Mile Woods scenic area of northern New Hampshire, the small park is free to use, open year-round, and offers a picnic area, canoeing, and fishing. It is part of Mollidgewock State Park.

The park is 1 of 10 New Hampshire state parks that are in the path of totality for the 2024 solar eclipse, with 2 minutes and 5 seconds of totality.

References

External links
Androscoggin Wayside Park New Hampshire Department of Natural and Cultural Resources

State parks of New Hampshire
Parks in Coös County, New Hampshire
Errol, New Hampshire
Protected areas established in 1958
1958 establishments in New Hampshire